Maharshi Valmiki Sanskrit University (MVSU) is a university established in 2018 by the Government of Haryana at Mundri village of Kaithal district of India. It is 12 km east of Kaithal, 111 km from the state capital Chandigarh, 145 km from Hisar, and 164 km from the NCR New Delhi.

History 
On 15 March 2018, the bill to establish this university was passed in Haryana Vidhan Sabha. Though the idea for this university was first conceived by the Chief Minister, Manohar Lal Khattar, in 2015. It was established through the Haryana Act No. 20 OF 2018. It is named after the Hindu sage, Valmiki, the celebrated Sanskrit literature author of Ramayana (500 BC to 100 BC), who was contemporary of Rama and revered as Ādi Kavi, the first poet, author of Ramayana, the first epic poem.

Haryana state has over 24 Sanskrit colleges offering education equivalent to bachelor's degree, additionally masters and doctoral level degrees are also offered by the Kurukshetra University and Maharshi Dayanand University.

The university

Objectives 
The university is established as a teaching and affiliating university for research in Sanskrit and its revival, vedas, Indic languages, Indian culture and Indian philosophy.

Campus
The university currently operates from its temporary campus at BR Ambedkar Government College, Kaithal while its campus is being constructed at Mundri village.

See also 

 List of Modern Sanskrit universities
 List of institutions of higher education in Haryana
 List of Sahitya Akademi Award winners for Sanskrit
 Kameshwar Singh Darbhanga Sanskrit University
 Sampurnanand Sanskrit University
 Rashtriya Sanskrit Sansthan
 Samskrita Bharati
 Mattur

References 

Universities in Haryana
Sanskrit universities in India
2018 establishments in Haryana
Educational institutions established in 2018
Universities established in the 2010s
Kaithal district